La Tienda en Casa (literally The Shop At Home) is a home-shopping channel run by department store El Corte Inglés and is broadcast in Spain. Available through satellite and cable, it broadcasts recorded infomercials in the Spanish language 24 hours a day. In addition to the channel, La Tienda en Casa also broadcasts some shorter infomercials during the day on nationally available Spanish networks.

External links 
 La Tienda en Casa Homepage 

Television stations in Spain
Shopping networks
Television channels and stations established in 2011
Television channels and stations disestablished in 2012
Television channels and stations established in 2014
Spanish-language television stations